Elections to Lewisham London Borough Council were held in May 1971.  The whole council was up for election. Turnout was 39.8%. This election had aldermen as well as councillors. Labour and the Conservatives each got five aldermen.

Election result

|}

Ward results

References

1971
1971 London Borough council elections